No. 32 Squadron  (Thunderbirds) is a fighter squadron of Indian Air Force. It was equipped with Mikoyan-Gurevich MiG-21Bison and was based at Jodhpur Air Force Station as part of South Western Air Command. The squadron was number plated in December 2016.

History
The squadron was formed with the Mystere IV on 15 Oct 1963 at Air Force Station Adampur. This  squadron later operated the Vampire (1965) aircraft followed by the Sukhoi-7 (1969), the MiG-21 Bis (1984) and is currently operating the Mig-21Bison (2003).

The squadron had received Presidential standard in 2013.

The squadron was number plated on an unspecified date. Currently, only 4 MiG-21 Bison squadron remains in service.

Assignments
 Indo-Pakistani War of 1965
 Indo-Pakistani War of 1971

Aircraft

References

032